Odontothelphusa is a genus of crabs in the family Pseudothelphusidae, containing the following species:
Odontothelphusa lacandona Alvarez & Villalobos, 1998
Odontothelphusa lacanjaensis Alvarez & Villalobos, 1998
Odontothelphusa maxillipes (Rathbun, 1898)
Odontothelphusa monodontis Rodríguez & Hobbs, 1989
Odontothelphusa palenquensis Alvarez & Villalobos, 1998
Odontothelphusa toninae Alvarez & Villalobos, 1991

References

Pseudothelphusidae